Louise Crane-Bowes is an Australian writer who was script producer of the TV series All Saints for a number of years and is currently script producer for Home and Away. She has also worked as a writer and script editor on such shows as Murder Call, Water Rats, and McLeod's Daughters.

References

External links
Louise Crane-Bowes at IMDb (as 'Louise Crane')

Australian women screenwriters
Living people
Year of birth missing (living people)